The bauma (International Trade Fair for Construction Machinery, Building Material Machines, Mining Machines, Construction Vehicles and Construction Equipment) is the world's largest trade fair in the construction industry. The trade fair, which can be visited by anyone, is held every three years on the grounds of the Neue Messe München and lasts for seven days. Its organizer is Messe München.

History
The first exhibition took place in 1954 as part of the “Baumusterschau” at Theresienhöhe in Munich and was then known as the spring show for construction machinery. 58 exhibitors presented their products on a total gross area of 20,000 m², attracting around 8,000 visitors. Two years later, the exhibition space had already doubled and the name “bauma”, which is still used today, was introduced. In the early days, the fair was a purely German exhibition. In 1958, the first exhibitors from abroad (number: 13) took part in bauma. 

Due to the building boom the exhibition space quickly became too small and the fair was relocated for the first time. In 1962, bauma opened its doors on a former airport site in Oberwiesenfeld, offering 100,000 m² more space for—in the meantime—more than 450 exhibitors. But the days of the new location were already numbered: the Olympic Park was created on this site as the 1972 Olympic Games had been awarded to Munich. In 1967, the annual bauma therefore returned to Theresienhöhe, where it remained for decades.

In 1967, bauma was transferred from private ownership to Messe München's portfolio, and in 1969, the first bauma was organized under the leadership of Messe München. Although successful right from the start, bauma then experienced an incomparable upswing: the award of the Olympic Games turned Munich into the largest construction site in Europe and brought the construction industry an unprecedented order situation. In 1998, the trade fair company moved from Theresienhöhe to Munich-Riem. Since then, bauma has also taken place there.

In 2002, bauma CHINA was launched as first foreign trade fair within the bauma network. In the meantime, bauma CHINA has become the largest capital goods fair in Asia and the second largest construction machinery fair in the world. And meanwhile there is a whole network of bauma trade fairs, including bauma CONEXPO INDIA, bauma CONEXPO AFRICA, bauma CTT RUSSIA and M&T EXPO.

Key figures
In terms of exhibition space, Bauma is both the largest trade fair in the industry and the biggest trade show in the world.

The past Bauma edition that took place from April 11 to 17, 2016 attracted 3,425 exhibitors from 58 countries (2013: 3,421 exhibitors; 2010: 3,256 exhibitors) and 583,736 visitors from 219 countries (2013: around 535,065; 2010: around 420,170). The exhibition space was 605,000 m² (2013: 575,000 m²; 2010: 555,000 m²).

Exhibitors
Both German and foreign suppliers of machinery and vehicles for construction and mining exhibit at the fair. The trade fair basically comprises four sectors. The "All around construction sites" sector includes suppliers of construction vehicles, construction machinery, construction tools, lifting appliances, formwork and scaffoldings. The exhibition sector "Mining, extraction and processing of raw materials" pools manufacturers of machines for the extraction of raw materials and mining as well as of mineral processing technology. The "Production of building materials" sector comprises machines and plants for producing concrete, asphalt, clay and similar building materials. Drive technology, testing, measurement and control technology as well as accessories including services are presented in the "Components and service suppliers" sector. Numerous scale model manufacturers exhibit scale models of the construction equipment.

References

External links

 

Economy of Munich
Trade fairs in Germany
Construction equipment